Spare Snare is a lo-fi band from Dundee, Scotland.

Founded in the early 1990s, the band have released 11 albums and 2 compilations to date, released on their own Chute Records, or licensed to another label. They have also recorded four John Peel Sessions. In the 1995 John Peel Festive 50, the band were number 32 with "Bugs". 

Spare Snare have been cited as an influence on acts such as Snow Patrol and the Fence Collective. 

Spare Snare were also voted as the 46th best Scottish band of all time.

In 2008 they had the bizarre privilege to cover Amazing Grace for BBC Radio Two’s Aled Jones Sunday show.  Spare Snare are the only band to have recorded sessions for both John Peel and Aled Jones.

Spare Snare released their 10th album, Victor, in June 2010, which was voted the 19th Best Scottish Album of 2010. 

The band made two rare live appearances at the Fence Collective Homegame festival in Anstruther and Tigerfest in Dunfermline in 2010. 

Two live sessions were performed for the Marc Riley BBC 6Music radio show on 16 July 2009 and 25 September 2018.

Spare Snare released their 11th album, Our Jazz, in April 2013, which was voted the 7th Best Scottish Album of 2013.

In February 2018, Spare Snare recorded their 13th album, Sounds Recorded by Steve Albini with producer Steve Albini. As well as the recording, Spare Snare and Albini presented a one day Engineers' Workshop at Chem19 Studios in Blantyre, Scotland.

It was announced in April 2022 that Spare Snare will record their 12th album, again with Steve Albini, in October 2022. 

The 12th album by Spare Snare shall be released in the Spring of 2023.

Members 
Jan Burnett – vocals, guitar, electronics, melodica
Alan Cormack – guitar, bass, drums, synths
Barry Gibson – drums, bass, guitar
Graeme Ogston – guitar, bass, synths
Adam Lockhart – guitar, synths, bass, voice
Michael Lambert – bass, synths, health & safety

Discography

Albums 
 Live at Home - released 1995 on Chute
 Disco Dancing - Compilation released 1995 on 100 Guitar Mania, licensed from Chute
 Westfield Lane - released 1996 on Wabana, licensed from Chute
 Animals and Me Released 1998 on Chute
 Love Your Early Stuff - Compilation released 1999 on Che, licensed from Chute
 Charm - released 2001 on Chute
 Learn to Play - released 2004 on Chute
 Garden Leave - released September 2006 on Chute
 I Love You, I Hate You - released June 2009 on Chute
 Victor - released June 2010 on Chute
 Our Jazz - released April 2013 on Chute
 Unicorn - released August 2017 on Chute
 Sounds Recorded by Steve Albini - released July 2018 on Chute

Singles and non-album songs 
This table shows all songs released as singles, and other songs that do not appear on Spare Snare studio albums.

References

External links 
 Uncut review of Sounds Recorded by Steve Albini
 Spare Snare discogs site
 Official Spare Snare site
 Spare Snare on MySpace
 Info from Jockrock
 Profile Check – A history of Spare Snare
 BBC Peel Sessions info
 Spare Snare live at WMBR Boston – 1995
 Spare Snare – Prospective Records site
 review of Spare Snare
 A review of Garden Leave

Scottish alternative rock groups
Lo-fi music groups